Mark R. Strahl  (born March 26, 1978) is a Canadian politician. He is the current Conservative Member of Parliament for the riding of Chilliwack—Hope. Strahl is the son of former Conservative MP and federal Cabinet Minister Chuck Strahl, who was the predecessor of the riding.

Career
Starting as an intern in Ottawa with Opposition Leader Preston Manning, Strahl also worked in the offices of former MP Grant McNally (Dewdney—Alouette) and MP Randy Kamp (Pitt Meadows—Maple Ridge—Mission).

On March 18, 2011, Strahl succeeded his father as nominee for the Conservative Party in the riding of Chilliwack—Fraser Canyon. The nomination process, which is usually four weeks, lasted only a week. Mark Strahl was endorsed by Preston Manning, former leader of the Reform Party of Canada, who in a particularly poignant moment of nepotism said "Mark Strahl -- by virtue of his family background ... is well prepared for service in the House of Commons."

Former Chilliwack city councillor Casey Langbroek said most Conservative Party members from the riding were upset and that the nomination process effectively barred 80% of party members from running. Party member Alex Moens said "High public office should not be like a family business, where it's passed on from father to son."

On May 2, 2011, Strahl was elected to the 41st Canadian Parliament as the member of parliament for Chilliwack—Fraser Canyon. He served as a member of the House of Commons Standing Committee on National Defence from 2011 to 2013.

On December 13, 2012, Strahl was named the chair of the B.C./Yukon Conservative Caucus.

On September 20, 2013, Prime Minister Stephen Harper named Strahl as the Parliamentary Secretary to the Minister of Aboriginal Affairs and Northern Development, a role he fulfilled until August 2015.

In 2015, Strahl was re-elected to the 42nd Canadian Parliament. On February 28, 2019, he introduced private member bill C-436 which sought to make November 1 of every year Acromegaly Awareness Day.

in 2021 Strahl was re-elected. However, Strahl was not given a shadow cabinet position.

On February 20, 2022, Mark issued a tweet that stated a constituent named "Brianne" had her bank account frozen for making a $50 donation to the "Freedom Convoy."  Vancouver Granville MP Taleeb Noormohamed said he was "quite skeptical" about the claim.

Personal life
Strahl is the son of former Conservative MP and federal Cabinet Minister Chuck Strahl, who held the same riding (with adjustments) from 1993 to 2011.

Strahl and his wife have been married since 1999; they have one son. They currently reside in Chilliwack, British Columbia.

Election results

References

External links
 

1977 births
Living people
Conservative Party of Canada MPs
Members of the House of Commons of Canada from British Columbia
People from Chilliwack
21st-century Canadian politicians